Suzhou formerly romanized as Suchow is a prefecture-level city in northern Anhui province. It borders the prefectural cities of Huaibei and Bengbu to the southwest and south respectively, the provinces of Jiangsu to the east, Shandong to the north, and Henan to the northwest.

Its population was 5,324,476 inhabitants at the 2020 census whom 1,766,285 lived in the built-up area (or metro) made of Yongqiao urban district, even though it remains largely rural.

History
Suzhou was formerly Su County.

Administration
Suzhou administers five county-level divisions, including one district and four counties.

Yongqiao District
Dangshan County
Xiao County
Lingbi County
Si County

These are further divided into 118 township-level divisions.

Climate
Suzhou has a monsoon-influenced, humid subtropical climate (Köppen Cwa), with four distinct seasons.

Festivals
Sacrifice to The Kitchen God

This festival is the traditional lunar festival of East Asia, celebrated in Suzhou. People think this festival is to give presents to gods. In Suzhou, this festival is celebrated by offering food and burning incense on a table and baijiu on the floor to worship the gods. This food is left untouched for, more or less, one day. Also, some food is shared with family and friends.

Pear Flower Festival

There are many pear trees in Suzhou and when their flowers bloom people get together to appreciate it and have a picnic. At night there is a festival program on Anhui TV to show how beautiful it is.

Sacred Stone Festival

Suzhou Lingbi Sacred Stone Festival aims to promote the charming and admirable Lingbi sculptures. This festival expands the economy, sets up an investment promotion platform, promotes Suzhou economic and social development, and enhances its visibility and reputation. People get together and show their unique and beautiful stones. They can be viewed at the Suzhou QiShi Museum. The city mayor chooses the best one to be sent to the National Museum of China.

Tourist Attractions 
Huangzangyu National Forest Park

Anhui Huangzangyu National Forest Park is located in the denuded low hills in the south of the Taoxu Mountain System. The mountain rocks are limestone bodies, and there are many natural caves, well springs, and rock landscapes. The highest peak is Pingdingshan, 389 meters above sea level, and the general peak height is between 100-300 meters.

Zhong Kui Wine Culture Museum

Zhongkui Wine Culture Museum is located in Lingbi County Economic Development Zone.

It is a typical Huizhou building, with white walls, black tiles and horse head walls, Zhongkui Hall in the courtyard and corridor, towering towers and pavilions, small bridges and flowing water houses, strange rocks, trees, and a total area of more than 3,000 square meters. , with a total construction area of more than 1,000 square meters, of which the main exhibition hall - "Zhong Kui Wine Culture Museum" has an exhibition area of more than 500 square meters, consisting of a gatehouse, curved corridors and the main exhibition hall. The decorative display in the main exhibition hall borrows the architectural elements of Huizhou style and coexists harmoniously with the external environment, complementing each other, the whole is smooth and smooth, and the ancient charm is vivid. The display content of the entire main exhibition hall consists of five parts.

Notes and references

External links
Government website of Suzhou (in Simplified Chinese)

 
Cities in Anhui